The fifth election to Tayside Regional Council was held on 3 May 1990 as part of the wider 1990 Scottish regional elections and British local elections. The election saw the council remain under no overall control, with Labour keeping their position as the single largest party on the 46 seat council.

Voter turnout was 47.8%.

Aggregate results

Ward results

References

1990 Scottish local elections
1990